Portage la Prairie/Southport Airport  is located adjacent to Portage la Prairie, Manitoba, Canada. It is operated by Southport Aerospace Centre Inc., a commercial-industrial centre. It was formerly Canadian Forces Base Portage la Prairie. It has been commercially operated since 1992.

The Aviation Training Centre operation of KF Defence Programs based at the airport. KF Defence Programs provides pilot training to the Royal Canadian Air Force and is a joint venture between KF Aerospace, Canadian Helicopters, Atlantis Systems International, and Canadian Base Operators. 3 Canadian Forces Flying Training School is based at the airport.

See also
 Portage la Prairie (North) Airport

References

External links
 Southport
 KF Defence Programs

Certified airports in Manitoba
Portage la Prairie